John A. Powers was an American football player and coach.  He served as the co-head football coach at Villanova College—now known as Villanova University—in 1900 with John J. Egan, compiling a record of 5–2–2.

Head coaching record

References

Year of birth missing
Year of death missing
19th-century players of American football
Villanova Wildcats football coaches
Villanova Wildcats football players